The Athletics Federation of Pakistan (AFP) is the apex body of athletics in Pakistan. It was formed in 1951. Major General (R) Muhammad Akram Sahi is the current President.

History
In 1951, the Federation acquired the rights to organize athletics in Pakistan from the IAAF. In 1962, the first elections were held and the body was granted affiliation by the Pakistan Olympic Association. Alvin Robert Cornelius was elected as AFP's first President, while A.U. Zafar was the Federation's its first Secretary.

Affiliations
The body is affiliated with:
 World Athletics
 Asian Athletics Association
 Pakistan Sports Board
 Pakistan Olympic Association

National Championship
In addition to a regular event at the National Games, AFP organizes National Athletics Championships for men and women in junior, senior, and master categories.

National Athletics Championships 
National Athletics Championships are held annually around the month of April and serve as the national championship for the track and field events in Pakistan.
The 50th edition will take place in 2021 with 14 teams Pakistan Army, Pakistan Air Force (PAF), Pakistan Navy, Pakistan WAPDA, Pakistan Railways, Higher Education Commission (HEC), Punjab, Sindh, Khyber Pakhtunkhwa, Balochistan, Islamabad, Azad Jammu and Kashmir, FATA and Gilgit Baltistan.

See also
 List of Pakistani records in athletics

References

External links
Official website
Athletics Federation of Pakistan on Facebook

Sports governing bodies in Pakistan
National members of the Asian Athletics Association
Athletics in Pakistan
Sports organizations established in 1951
1951 establishments in Pakistan